Johannesson is a surname of Swedish or Icelandic origin, meaning son of Johannes. In Icelandic names the name is not strictly a surname, but a patronymic. In Icelandic names the name is spelled Jóhannesson, with the accent acute over the ó. The name refers to:
Axella Johannesson (b. 1958), Australian singer and songwriter
Berit Jóhannesson (b. 1946), Swedish politician; member of the Riksdag 1998–2006
Jón Ásgeir Jóhannesson (b. 1968), Icelandic businessman and investment manager
Karen H. Johannesson, American geochemist
Kerstin Johannesson (born 1955), Swedish biologist
Konrad Johannesson (1896–1968), Canadian professional ice hockey player
Laurel Johannesson (contemporary), Canadian artist
Markus Johannesson (b. 1975), Swedish professional football player
Mona Johannesson (b. 1987), Swedish model
Ólafur Jóhannesson (b. 1957), Icelandic professional football manager
Ólafur Jóhannesson (1913–1984), Icelandic politician; prime minister of Iceland 1971–74 and 1978–79
Richard Johannesson (b. 1969), Canadian Businessman

Swedish-language surnames